Harry Persson (4 August 1906 – 28 November 1961) was a Swedish actor and singer. He appeared in over 15 films.

Selected filmography
 Gamla gatans karneval (1924) 
 Farmors revolution (1933)
 The Boys of Number Fifty Seven (1935)
 Skanör-Falsterbo (1939) 
 Kalle's Inn (1939)
 Stinsen på Lyckås (1942)
 Skåningar (1944)
 Rännstensungar (1944)
 Jolanta the Elusive Pig (1945)
 Trav, hopp och kärlek (1945)
 Sten Stensson kommer till stan (1945)
 Ebberöds bank (1946)
 The Red Horses (1954)
 A Night at Glimmingehus (1954)
 Time of Desire (1954)
 Kärlek på turné (1955)

External links

1906 births
1961 deaths
Swedish male film actors
20th-century Swedish male actors